Bereldange is a town in the commune of Walferdange, in central Luxembourg.  As of 2005, the town has a population of 3,570.

Though only a small town, Bereldange sports most of the facilities a family requires: supermarkets; petrol-stations; school; and fast-food chains. In the neighbouring town Walferdange (the centre of the commune) there are also sports facilities (including tennis courts, two full-size football pitches, a cricket pitch and a rugby field).

As of January the first, 1851, Bereldange is no longer a part of the Commune de Steinsel.

Walferdange
Towns in Luxembourg